Skaføgård is a manor house in the parish of Hvilsager  in Syddjurs Municipality in the eastern Jutland peninsula of Djursland, Denmark. It is not one of Denmark's largest manor-houses, but one of the best preserved. Inside there is an enormous oak closet carved by the Dutch carpenter Mikkel van Gronningen whose most famous work is the pulpit in Århus Cathedral.

History
Skaføgård was built around 1580 by Danish nobleman Jørgen Rosenkrantz (1523-1596) who had two sons: Otto Rosenkrantz and Holger Rosenkrantz (1574-1642). As soon as he was able, he built a manor for both of them: Skaføgård and Rosenholm  in 1559.   Unfortunately Otto died early, after which Skaføgård became a dower house for Jørgen's wife, Dorthe Lange, until her death in 1613. After this the estate was handed over to the son Holger. His son Gunde Rosenkrantz  (1604-1675) had to sell it in 1647 because of poor finances. After that the estate often changed hands in the following century.

One of the later owners was Jacob Brønnum Scavenius Estrup  (1825–1913) who acquired it in 1852. His descendants still own Skaføgård.

Owners 
(1492–1503) Erik Ottesen Rosenkrantz
(1503–1520) Holger Eriksen Rosenkrantz
(1520–1542) Otte Holgersen Rosenkrantz
(1542–1596) Jørgen Ottesen Rosenkrantz
(1596–1613) Dorthe Lange (widow)
(1613–1642) Holger Rosenkrantz "the learned"
(1642–1647) Gunde Rosenkrantz
(1647–1666) Steen Bille
(1666–1681) Henrik Ditlev Holck
(1681–1712) Mette Steensdatter Bille married Holck
(1712–1749) Thomas Nicolaj Nielsen Behr
(1749–1778) Niels Thomsen Behr
(1778–1779) Niels Thomsen Behrs dødsbo
(1779–1786) Poul Nielsen Behr
(1786–1797) Anna Jørgensdatter Mørch married Behr
(1797–1852) Jørgen Mørch Secher
(1852–1907) Jacob Brønnum Scavenius Estrup
(1907–1939) Jacob Estrup (son)
(1939–1967) Niels Rudolph Estrup (nephew)
(1967–1971) Hector Estrup / Vilhelm Estrup / Christian Estrup (Niels' 3 sons)
(1971–2007) Hector Estrup
(2007–    ) Jacob Christen Estrup (son)

References

External links 
 Skaføgård på  1001 fortællinger om Danmark 

Manor houses in Denmark
Buildings and structures in Syddjurs Municipality
Buildings and structures completed in 1582
Tourist attractions in Denmark
Tourist attractions in the Central Denmark Region
Buildings and structures in Denmark associated with the Rosenkrantz family
Buildings and structures associated with the Estrup family